Zina Pitcher (April 12, 1797, in Sandy Hill, New York – April 5, 1872, in Detroit) was an American physician, politician, educator, and academic administrator. He was a president of the American Medical Association, a two-time mayor of Detroit and a member of the Board of Regents of the University of Michigan.

Biography

Early life
Pitcher was born in Sandy Hill, New York, on April 12, 1797. He was the son of Nathaniel Pitcher Sr., who died in Sandy Hill in 1802, and Margaret Stevenson, who died in Kingsbury, in 1819. He was the younger half-brother of Nathaniel Pitcher, a future Governor of New York. (In his 1836 will, Nathaniel mentioned an Osage orange walking stick given to him by Zina.) Another of Zina's brothers was James Pitcher, who became the first mayor of the city of Little Rock, Arkansas, in 1835. Zina attended Middlebury College in Vermont and graduated in medicine in 1822.

Career
Pitcher joined the Army in 1822 as an assistant surgeon, and was promoted to the rank of major in 1836 as a full surgeon. He was president of the Army Medical Board in 1835, and resigned from the Army at the end of 1836.

Pitcher was also an excellent botanist (not uncommon for medical professionals of his day). He collected and studied plants in the Great Lakes region, and the exceedingly rare Pitcher's thistle (Cirsium pitcheri) was first collected by him from the Grand Sable Dunes during his service as an Army surgeon; subsequently it was named for him as well. At times Pitcher teamed with botanist Thomas Nuttall.

He moved to Detroit, and was elected mayor for two separate terms, once from 1840–1841 and again in 1843. He was also a regent of the University of Michigan from 1837 until 1852 where he bought a copy of Audobon's "Birds of America" for the library. He served as president of the American Medical Association from 1856 to 1857, presiding over its annual meeting in Detroit.

He died in Detroit on April 5, 1872, and is buried in Elmwood Cemetery.

Commemoration
 The Zina Pitcher Collegiate Professorship of the History of Medicine at the University of Michigan Medical School
 Zina Pitcher Place, a street leading into the University of Michigan Medical Center
 The Great Lakes endemic plant, Pitcher's thistle, named for its discoverer.

Notes

References

External links

Elmwood Cemetery Biography

Mayors of Detroit
Regents of the University of Michigan
1797 births
1872 deaths
Burials at Elmwood Cemetery (Detroit)
Presidents of the American Medical Association
Physicians from New York (state)
American botanists
Middlebury College alumni
People from Hudson Falls, New York
19th-century American politicians
Scientists from New York (state)